Jack Cooper (born John Thomas Cooper Jr., May 14, 1963) is an American composer, arranger, orchestrator, multireedist, and music educator. He has performed with, written music for and recorded by internationally known pop, jazz, and classical artists.

Intro
Cooper has performed with, written music for or recorded by internationally known pop, jazz, and classical artists including Aaron Neville, Marc Secara, Jiggs Whigham, the Berlin Jazz Orchestra, Lenny Pickett, Joyce Cobb, the BBB featuring Bernie Dresel, Duffy Jackson, Donald Brown, Young Voices Brandenburg, Jimi Tunnell, Christian McBride, the Westchester Jazz Orchestra, the U.S. Army Jazz Ambassadors, the Dallas Winds, and the Memphis Symphony Orchestra.

Early life, musical education and influences
Jack Cooper was born in Whittier, California on May 14, 1963; his given birth name passed down from his great-grandfather and father, John Thomas Cooper.  He was raised in the nearby, northeastern section of La Habra (remote, Southeastern base of the Puente Hills). He is the younger brother of artist and stylist Cathy Cooper, grandson of H.V. Cooper and also the grandson (x4) of Harriet Byron McAllister His mother, Georgie Cooper, was an accomplished classical pianist; his Godfather Robert Voris was a well known baritone-bass vocal soloist.  Cooper's father was an amateur clarinet and sax player who gave Cooper his first instruments.  He was first inspired by clarinetist Artie Shaw at age eleven, he soon was taken by Charlie Parker heard from 78's; he learned flute in college.

After graduating from Sonora High School and having first studied with Ernie Del Fante, Cooper attended Fullerton College where he studied composition and arranging with Tom Ranier and saxophone with Dave Edwards and Don Raffell (later studied with Peter Yellin in New York). While at Fullerton College he recorded on the Down Beat award-winning LP, Time Tripping.  He later transferred to California State University, Los Angeles where he received a BA in Music education and clarinet in 1987.  Cooper also studied jazz composition with composers Bob Curnow and David Caffey.   "Since college, when I first began studying big band musical arrangements, (I) wanted to orchestrate for jazz ensembles." Two years later he completed a MA in composition at C.S.U.L.A. and had studied with Byong-Kon Kim, George Heussenstamm and William H. Hill.   He has collaborated closely on several professional projects with CSULA classmate Luis Bonilla. Early on in Cooper's life he started experiencing acute Synesthesia/Chromesthesia which would become an important part of his process to composing and arranging music.

Later composition studies were with David Baker, Gerald Wilson, Manny Albam, Karl Korte, and Richard Lawn; in 1999 he earned a DMA in composition from the University of Texas at Austin. 
 
His first notable professional work in Los Angeles as a multireedist was with the Kingsmen, Shari Lewis, Mateos Parseghian, the Tak Shindo Orchestra, Si Zentner, Steve Jam, the Dive, and the Last Mile.

Armed forces and the West Point Jazz Knights

At age 25 (in 1989) Cooper was hired as a saxophonist/woodwind doubler and staff arranger for the United States Army Jazz Knights, a premier musical ensemble of the United States Armed Forces. For 6 years he toured, performed, wrote for and recorded extensively with the West Point Band's musical group to include A&E television appearances at the Hatch Memorial Shell with the Boston Pops, jazz festivals across the Northeastern United States, backing entertainers and jazz artists. He participated in the funeral of former President Richard M. Nixon in April 1994.

While in New York he worked extensively backing entertainers and artists such as Tony Martin, The Lettermen, Clint Holmes, Fred Travalena, Dennis Wolfberg, and worked as arranger and saxophonist with the band Alma Latina.  Cooper was introduced by composer Carl Strommen  during this time to Columbia Pictures Publishing/Belwin and Warner Bros.; Double Helix was the first of many works published.

Professional career

As instrumentalist
Cooper has played woodwind instruments professionally since the 1980s.  His work includes backing Jennifer Holliday, Lady Rizo, Kenny Rogers, Macy Gray, Manhattan Transfer, Glen Campbell, Mitch Ryder (and Detroit Wheels), Chris Stamey and playing woodwinds on national tours for the Producers, Sweet Charity, and A Chorus Line. He has played in saxophone sections for the Tommy Dorsey Orchestra, the Guy Lombardo Orchestra, the Temptations and on the CD Coming Through Slaughter: The Bolden Legend. He has also been a featured guest artist/soloist at the Western States Jazz Festival, the Birmingham International Jazz and Blues Festival (U.K.), the 45th International Horn Symposium, and the Festival Virtuosi (2007) in Recife, Brazil.   Also as a woodwind player, Cooper has been a featured classical artist and soloist with the Hot Springs Festival Orchestra, Memphis Symphony Orchestra, the IRIS Symphony Orchestra, and as a chamber soloist internationally.

As composer (highlights)
Cooper first writing music professionally in the early 1980s. He was first hired in 1992 as a staff arranger for Columbia Pictures Publishing/Belwin; his television and media music writing credits include The Jenny Jones Show, Danish Radio 2 (DR P2), E! Entertainment shows, Access Hollywood, JBVO: Your All Request Cartoon Show, American Restoration, Deal or No Deal, and Extra. His music has been featured at numerous venues around the world to include the North Sea Jazz Festival and the Montreux Jazz Festival.  He is the musical director, composer and chief arranger for the Jazz Orchestra of the Delta; in 2003 they produced the CD Big Band Reflections of Cole Porter. He also serves as the musical director and chief arranger for Kathy Kosins and her show Rhapsody in Boop.  In February 2006 Cooper collaborated with choreographer Mark Godden to produce the ballet Two Jubilees commissioned by and for Ballet Memphis. His musical influence on the ballet gained critical acclaim.

Though his catalogue has a great deal of varied music, his work emphasizes the big band genre. His big band writing has been featured with many groups internationally on the professional and educational levels,  "...this style of jazz music (sic) is my wheel house of expertise." Two definitive CDs were recorded in 2014 that exemplify Cooper's adeptness as a jazz orchestra composer and arranger: Mists: Charles Ives for Jazz Orchestra and Time Within Itself.   Both are recognized internationally as exceptional examples of contemporary, progressive big band composition and orchestration. As a staff composer and arranger, he is featured with the BBB featuring Bernie Dresel on their acclaimed 2022 CD The Pugilist.

Chamber and solo works
His Sonata for Trombone was commissioned in 1997 and has been widely performed and recorded by trombone artists including Mark Hetzler, Tom Brantley, Lance Green, Chris Buckholtz, and Michael Davidson (among others). The work is recorded on two highly acclaimed recordings for Centaur Records and Summit Records.  Cooper's 2nd Sonata for Trombone was completed in 2018 and recorded on the release Synthesis for SkyDeck Music.  The Sonata for Alto Saxophone was commissioned for and first premiered in July 2000 at the 12th World Saxophone Congress in Montreal, Canada.  It is described as belonging with "such landmark 'jazz/classical' pieces as the Phil Woods Sonata, on any recital or concert program that explores (both) these worlds."

One of the Missing – for those lost in Iraq for euphonium was commissioned in 2007 and premiered in 2008. It is a protest piece that shows the composer's anti-war stance against the Iraq War; the title is taken from the anti-war/Civil War short story and film adaptation of Ambrose Bierce. The work was also used on the soundtrack of a 2011 Canadian television film broadcast on the Vision network.  Cooper's Violin Sonata was premiered on May 27, 2018 as part of the Barnstedter Kapellen Konserte series in Barnstedt, Germany; recording of the work for commercial release was on June 26/27 at Greve Studio in Berlin.

Berlin, Germany

From June 2015 through August 2016 Cooper resided full-time in the Charlottenburg-Wilmersdorf borough of Berlin, Germany and continues to commute between the U.S. and Germany and makes his home in both Schöneberg, Berlin and Memphis, Tennessee.   He serves as a staff arranger, musical director and production assistant for Marc Secara and the Berlin Jazz Orchestra for live performances and recording sessions. He also assisted in arranging for the Collegium musicum Potsdam Symphony Orchestra and the Compass Big Band.    Cooper has conducted music and performed in venues such at the Wühlmäuse Theater, Heimathafen Neukölln and Kunstfabrik Schlot.  He also served as a Visiting professor and Artist-in-residence at the SRH Hochschule der populären Künste and is currently a visiting professor at the Universität Erfurt.   He has worked closely with German jazz, pop and Schlager personalities such as Marc Secara, Jiggs Whigham and Marc Marshall.   Since 2018, Cooper has collaborated with German, film documentary director Anne-Kathrin Peitz.  He is featured on the award winning The Unanswered Ives documentary and is and also featured on the 2022 television documentary about the life and music of composer Paul Dessau.

Awards and special recognition
Jack Cooper was named the Pearl Wales Professor of Music of the University of Memphis in August or 2020.  He was also the 2020 recipient of the University of Memphis CCFA Dean's Creative Achievement Award and the 2010 recipient of the Distinguished Achievement in the Creative Arts Award from the UMAA. He was chosen in 2003 as a nominee for the annual NARAS Premier Player Awards and also was awarded a $10,000 grant from the Aaron Copland Fund for Recording Program in 2003. He is also the recipient of numerous ASCAP composer awards since 1996. As a presenter he has been honored as the key-note speaker for the Modern Language Association, scholar and main presenter for four different National Endowment for the Humanities series on American Music, and the Hawaii International Conference on Arts & Humanities.

Teaching and education career
Cooper has been teaching at the collegiate level for over 20 years, earning the rank of Professor.  Before his appointment to the University of Memphis as director of jazz studies in 1998, he had taught privately and worked as a clinician for the U.S. Army Jazz Knights.   He has served as an invited clinician, guest artist, and conductor in Recife (Brazil), Birmingham (U.K), Berlin Germany, Graz Austria and Bogotá Colombia.  He has also served as guest conductor for the Missouri All-State Collegiate Jazz Orchestra, the Arkansas All-State High School Jazz Ensemble, and the Arizona All-State High School Jazz Ensemble.   From Fall of 2016 through March 2020, Cooper served as host of the WUMR radio program The Voice of Jazz which aired on Wednesday night from 5-6 P.M. CST.

Timeline of professional/musical career

Audio Recordings

As featured artist, composer or producer

 2003: Big Band Reflections of Cole Porter (Summit Records)
 2004: Memphis Jazz Box (Ice House Records)
 2007: Voices (Select-O-Hits)
 2009: Out of the Bluffs (Select-O-Hits)
 2010: The Chamber Wind Music of Jack Cooper(Centaur Records)
 2014: Mists: Charles Ives for Jazz Orchestra (Planet Arts Records)
 2015: Time Within Itself (Origin Records)
 2018: Origin Suite (Origin Records)
 2021: Songs of Berlin (GAM Music)

As composer, arranger, conductor or producer (and instrumentalist on select tracks) 

 1985: The New in You (H D C Music Publications)
 1986: We're Back! (H D C Music Publications)
 1987: Diversions (H D C Music Publications)
 1988: Monstrosity! (H D C Music Publications)
 1990: It's About Time (CSULA 890)
 1993: The USMA Band (Mark Records DC 1401)
 1994: Mainstream (JLFC)
 1996: Jump Shot! (RM 169D)
 1997: Sixth Floor Jazz (UTJO)
 1997: Celebration! (FC)
 1997: Fascinatin' Rhythm (ROPA JAZZ)
 1998: Games (UNI)
 1999: Meanwhile... (OCJ Jazz)
 2000: Once in a Blue Moon (UTJO)
 2000: Illusion (Benjamino Music)
 2001: The Eleventh Hour (Seabreeze Jazz)
 2001 Showcase 2001 
 2002: Up Your Brass (Seabreeze Jazz)
 2002: Summertime (AJE)
 2003: Eclectikos (Dekajaz)
 2003: Standard Deviations (HDCD)
 2003: Upside Out (Seabreeze-Vista Jazz)
 2006: Minimal Effort (UNL)
 2011: Enriching Life With Jazz (JazzMN)
 2012: Peanuts for Christmas (iTunes, MP3 album)
 2013: Juletona (Daniel Engen Productions)
 2014: Sounds of the Season (BlueTom Records)
2015: Local Color (UNI)
2015: Blues, Ballads and Beyond  (Summit Records)
2016: Sound of Home (Junge Töne)
2016: I Can Do All Things (JWM)
2017: Neujahrskonzert  (Aktiv Sound Records)
2018: Synthesis (SkyDeck Music)  
2020: Almost Alone (ADC Recordings)
2021: Time Frames (Origin Classical)
2021: The Pugilist (DIG-IT)
2022: Love Never Changes (JWM)
2022 Crosscurrents (Schoener Hören Music)

As instrumentalist 

 1982: Escape to Asylum  (FC/parts re-released with Trend AM PM Records)
 1983: Classical Expression  (FCLP)
 1983: Time Tripping (Trend AM PM Records)
 1984: Primarily Jazz (Trend AM PM Records)
 1985: Unforgettable (Trend AM PM Records)
 1998: Live at Ringside (OCJ Jazz)
 2003: Swingopoly (NMH Jazz)
 2003: Ninety Years of Making Music (UMAA)
 2009: Coming Through Slaughter: The Bolden Legend (SkyDeck Music)
 2022: Small Places (CC Music)

Film, television, DVD, video

As instrumentalist/actor/interviewed

 1988: Man Against the Mob (television movie, NBC)
 2005: Mississippi Rising (MSNBC)
 2010: Why I Chose... (CBS, ESPN)<ref>Jack Cooper-solo tenor sax, Cathy chose... the University of Memphis, uofmemphisvideos</ref>
 2018: The Unanswered Ives (Accentus Music, Arte)
 2022: Paul Dessau: Let's Hope For The Best (Yellow Table Media GmbH, Arte)

As composer/arranger/conductor/musical director

 1995: Twice is Nice (UMG/FirstCom)
 2008: Candle on the Bluff Awards (PBS, WKNO)
 2009: Candle on the Bluff Awards (PBS, WKNO)
 2011: Live at Nine  (CBS) WREG
 2012: The Art Academy (True Story Pictures)

Published music, books, educational media, articles as reviewer

 1995: Double Helix 2005: The Greenwood Encyclopedia of African American Folklore (Greenwood Press) – four entries authored 
 2007: Experiencing Jazz (Routledge Publishing) – contributing author for DVD and web content 
 2008: Winter Wonderland (SmartMusic)
 2008: MTSBOA Jazz Bands 2 CD set (Heartdance Music Inc.)
 2011: JazzTimes Magazine 
 2012: Perfectly Composed (CD ROM) 
 2014: Practical Music Theory (Kendall Hunt Publishing) – music for chapter 19
 2019: Composing Jazz (SkyDeck Music) contributing author

Other artists worked with (partial list)

 Jason Alexander
 Bob Brookmeyer
 Glen Campbell
 Larry Elgart
 Lesley Gore
 Jennifer Holliday
 Abbey Lincoln
 Tony Martin
 Brian McKnight
 Mulgrew Miller
 James Moody
 Oscar Peterson
 Benny Powell
 Rufus Reid
 Molly Ringwald
 Smokey Robinson
 Ray Romano
 David Sánchez
 Roseanna Vitro
 Nancy Wilson
 The Lettermen
 The Four Tops
 The O'Jays
 The Spinners
 The Shirelles
 The Temptations

Discography (select, reviewed)

See also

 List of jazz arrangers
 List of jazz contrafacts
 Jazz Orchestra of the Delta
 List of Concert Works for Saxophone
 Brass Quintet Répertoire
 Euphonium Répertoire
 Clarinet sonata
Sonata for Trombone (Cooper)

References

External links

 
 

Jack Cooper at Rate Your Music

 Jack Cooper at JazzTimes Jack Cooper at All About Jazz''
 Alfred Music Publishing
 University of Memphis School of Music 
 Brassworks 4 Publishing
 Jack Cooper on Memphis Machine

Living people
1963 births
Jazz musicians from California
University of Memphis faculty
Musicians from Memphis, Tennessee
American clarinetists
American jazz clarinetists
American jazz saxophonists
American male saxophonists
American jazz bandleaders
Big band bandleaders
Jazz arrangers
American jazz composers
American male jazz composers
American conductors (music)
American male conductors (music)
American music arrangers
American television composers
Third stream musicians
Composers for trombone
Composers for piano
American jazz educators
University of Texas at Austin College of Fine Arts alumni
California State University, Los Angeles alumni
Fullerton College alumni
People from La Habra, California
United States Army Band musicians
21st-century American saxophonists
21st-century clarinetists
21st-century American male musicians
Summit Records artists
Centaur Records artists
Origin Records artists